Medvedevo is the name of several inhabited localities in Russia.

Modern localities

Arkhangelsk Oblast
As of 2012, two rural localities in Arkhangelsk Oblast bear this name:
Medvedevo, Kargopolsky District, Arkhangelsk Oblast, a village in Krechetovsky Selsoviet of Kargopolsky District
Medvedevo, Onezhsky District, Arkhangelsk Oblast, a village in Chekuyevsky Selsoviet of Onezhsky District

Chelyabinsk Oblast
As of 2012, one rural locality in Chelyabinsk Oblast bears this name:
Medvedevo, Chelyabinsk Oblast, a selo in Timiryazevsky Selsoviet of Chebarkulsky District

Republic of Crimea
As of 2012, one rural locality in Republic of Crimea bears this name:
Medvedevo, Republic of Crimea, a selo in Chernomorsky District

Ivanovo Oblast
As of 2012, two rural localities in Ivanovo Oblast bear this name:
Medvedevo, Lukhsky District, Ivanovo Oblast, a village in Lukhsky District
Medvedevo, Teykovsky District, Ivanovo Oblast, a village in Teykovsky District

Kaliningrad Oblast
As of 2012, one rural locality in Kaliningrad Oblast bears this name:
Medvedevo, Kaliningrad Oblast, a settlement in Krasnotorovsky Rural Okrug of Zelenogradsky District

Kirov Oblast
As of 2012, one rural locality in Kirov Oblast bears this name:
Medvedevo, Kirov Oblast, a village in Voysky Rural Okrug of Pizhansky District;

Kostroma Oblast
As of 2012, one rural locality in Kostroma Oblast bears this name:
Medvedevo, Kostroma Oblast, a village in Leontyevskoye Settlement of Manturovsky District;

Lipetsk Oblast
As of 2012, one rural locality in Lipetsk Oblast bears this name:
Medvedevo, Lipetsk Oblast, a village in Slobodskoy Selsoviet of Lebedyansky District;

Mari El Republic
As of 2012, one urban locality in the Mari El Republic bears this name:
Medvedevo, Mari El Republic, an urban-type settlement in Medvedevsky District;

Moscow Oblast
As of 2012, two rural localities in Moscow Oblast bear this name:
Medvedevo, Stupinsky District, Moscow Oblast, a village in Leontyevskoye Rural Settlement of Stupinsky District; 
Medvedevo, Voskresensky District, Moscow Oblast, a village in Ashitkovskoye Rural Settlement of Voskresensky District;

Nizhny Novgorod Oblast
As of 2012, one rural locality in Nizhny Novgorod Oblast bears this name:
Medvedevo, Nizhny Novgorod Oblast, a village in Medvedevsky Selsoviet under the administrative jurisdiction of the town of oblast significance of Semyonov;

Novgorod Oblast
As of 2012, three rural localities in Novgorod Oblast bear this name:
Medvedevo, Moshenskoy District, Novgorod Oblast, a village in Kalininskoye Settlement of Moshenskoy District
Medvedevo, Bogoslovskoye Settlement, Pestovsky District, Novgorod Oblast, a village in Bogoslovskoye Settlement of Pestovsky District
Medvedevo, Okhonskoye Settlement, Pestovsky District, Novgorod Oblast, a village in Okhonskoye Settlement of Pestovsky District

Oryol Oblast
As of 2012, one rural locality in Oryol Oblast bears this name:
Medvedevo, Oryol Oblast, a village in Platonovsky Selsoviet of Orlovsky District;

Perm Krai
As of 2012, two rural localities in Perm Krai bear this name:
Medvedevo, Bolshesosnovsky District, Perm Krai, a village in Bolshesosnovsky District
Medvedevo, Kishertsky District, Perm Krai, a selo in Kishertsky District

Pskov Oblast
As of 2012, two rural localities in Pskov Oblast bear this name:
Medvedevo, Gdovsky District, Pskov Oblast, a village in Gdovsky District
Medvedevo, Palkinsky District, Pskov Oblast, a village in Palkinsky District

Ryazan Oblast
As of 2012, one rural locality in Ryazan Oblast bears this name:
Medvedevo, Ryazan Oblast, a village in Poshchupovsky Rural Okrug of Rybnovsky District

Smolensk Oblast
As of 2012, one rural locality in Smolensk Oblast bears this name:
Medvedevo, Smolensk Oblast, a village in Medvedevskoye Rural Settlement of Tyomkinsky District

Sverdlovsk Oblast
As of 2012, one rural locality in Sverdlovsk Oblast bears this name:
Medvedevo, Sverdlovsk Oblast, a selo in Medvedevsky Selsoviet under the administrative jurisdiction of the Town of Nizhnyaya Salda

Tver Oblast
As of 2012, nine rural localities in Tver Oblast bear this name:
Medvedevo, Belsky District, Tver Oblast, a village in Demyakhovskoye Rural Settlement of Belsky District
Medvedevo, Bologovsky District, Tver Oblast, a village in Kemetskoye Rural Settlement of Bologovsky District
Medvedevo, Kashinsky District, Tver Oblast, a village in Farafonovskoye Rural Settlement of Kashinsky District
Medvedevo, Konakovsky District, Tver Oblast, a village in Yuryevo-Devichyevskoye Rural Settlement of Konakovsky District
Medvedevo, Krasnokholmsky District, Tver Oblast, a village in Barbinskoye Rural Settlement of Krasnokholmsky District
Medvedevo, Rzhevsky District, Tver Oblast, a village in Medvedevo Rural Settlement of Rzhevsky District
Medvedevo, Selizharovsky District, Tver Oblast, a village in Talitskoye Rural Settlement of Selizharovsky District
Medvedevo, Toropetsky District, Tver Oblast, a village in Ploskoshskoye Rural Settlement of Toropetsky District
Medvedevo, Vyshnevolotsky District, Tver Oblast, a village in Yesenovichskoye Rural Settlement of Vyshnevolotsky District

Tyumen Oblast
As of 2012, one rural locality in Tyumen Oblast bears this name:
Medvedevo, Tyumen Oblast, a selo in Medvedevsky Rural Okrug of Golyshmanovsky District

Vladimir Oblast
As of 2012, one rural locality in Vladimir Oblast bears this name:
Medvedevo, Vladimir Oblast, a village in Vyaznikovsky District

Volgograd Oblast
As of 2012, one rural locality in Volgograd Oblast bears this name:
Medvedevo, Volgograd Oblast, a selo in Orekhovsky Selsoviet of Danilovsky District

Vologda Oblast
As of 2012, six rural localities in Vologda Oblast bear this name:
Medvedevo, Anokhinsky Selsoviet, Gryazovetsky District, Vologda Oblast, a village in Anokhinsky Selsoviet of Gryazovetsky District
Medvedevo, Pertsevsky Selsoviet, Gryazovetsky District, Vologda Oblast, a village in Pertsevsky Selsoviet of Gryazovetsky District
Medvedevo, Nesterovsky Selsoviet, Sokolsky District, Vologda Oblast, a village in Nesterovsky Selsoviet of Sokolsky District
Medvedevo, Prigorodny Selsoviet, Sokolsky District, Vologda Oblast, a village in Prigorodny Selsoviet of Sokolsky District
Medvedevo, Totemsky District, Vologda Oblast, a village in Medvedevsky Selsoviet of Totemsky District
Medvedevo, Vologodsky District, Vologda Oblast, a village in Sosnovsky Selsoviet of Vologodsky District

Yaroslavl Oblast
As of 2012, four rural localities in Yaroslavl Oblast bear this name:
Medvedevo, Bolsheselsky District, Yaroslavl Oblast, a village in Blagoveshchensky Rural Okrug of Bolsheselsky District
Medvedevo, Rostovsky District, Yaroslavl Oblast, a village in Fatyanovsky Rural Okrug of Rostovsky District
Medvedevo, Tutayevsky District, Yaroslavl Oblast, a village in Chebakovsky Rural Okrug of Tutayevsky District
Medvedevo, Yaroslavsky District, Yaroslavl Oblast, a village in Levtsovsky Rural Okrug of Yaroslavsky District

Alternative names
Medvedevo, alternative name of Medvedovo, a selo in Medvedovsky Rural Administrative Okrug of Klintsovsky District in Bryansk Oblast; 
Medvedevo, alternative name of Medvedovo, a village in Volynovsky Selsoviet of Vetluzhsky District in Nizhny Novgorod Oblast;

Notes